Kim Jeong-su, Kim Jung-soo or Kim Jong-su may also refer to:
Kim Jong-su (athlete) (born 1970), North Korean long-distance runner
Kim Jung-soo (baseball), a player on the Kia Tigers
Kim Jung-soo (footballer) (born 1975), South Korean footballer
Kim Jung-soo (politician), a South Korean government official
Kim Jung-soo (martial artist), a South Korean Taekwondo champion
Kim Jong-su (born 1977), North Korean sport shooter
Kim Jong-su (footballer) North Korean footballer
Kim Jung-su (born 1981), South Korean bobsledder